Tatyana Golovkina is a Russian-American microbiologist. She was awarded the 2020 KT Jeang Retrovirology prize. She is a 2019 Fellow of the American Association for the Advancement of Science.

She graduated from Moscow State University, and Cancer Research Center in Moscow. She teaches at  University of Chicago.

References 

Living people
Year of birth missing (living people)
Fellows of the American Association for the Advancement of Science
American microbiologists
Moscow State University alumni
University of Chicago faculty
American people of Russian descent